School No. 6 is a historic school building located at Lima in Livingston County, New York. It was constructed about 1843 and is a 1-story, vernacular Greek Revival cobblestone building consisting of a two-by-two-bay main block with a one-by-one-bay east wing.  It features irregularly shaped, variously sized and colored cobbles in its construction. The school closed in 1943 and converted to a residence after 1953.

It was listed on the National Register of Historic Places in 1989.

References

School buildings on the National Register of Historic Places in New York (state)
Cobblestone architecture
School buildings completed in 1843
Buildings and structures in Livingston County, New York
1843 establishments in New York (state)
National Register of Historic Places in Livingston County, New York